Coprothermobacterales is a new taxonomic order of thermophilic bacteria in the class Coprothermobacteria of the phylum Coprothermobacterota.

Its name derives from the type genus of this order, Coprothermobacter, with the ending suffix '-ales', to denote an order.

The bacteria of this order have a rod-shaped morphology, do not produce spores, are nonmotile, strictly anaerobic and, being thermophiles, grow at temperature ranges above 35°C and below 70°C, for a pH between 5.0 and 9.4. Moreover, these bacteria are chemoorganotrophs and proteolytic fermenters, which produce acetic acid, H2, and CO2 as main end-products of fermentation.

References 

Bacteria orders
Coprothermobacterota